Heinz Werner (12 April 1916 – 12 September 1968) was a German footballer and coach. He died in September 1968 at the age of 52.

References

1916 births
1968 deaths
Association football goalkeepers
Chemnitzer FC managers
Dynamo Dresden managers
East German football managers
East German footballers
Footballers from Saxony
FSV Zwickau managers
People from Riesa